Progress M-01M, identified by NASA as Progress 31P, was a Progress spacecraft used to resupply the International Space Station. It was the first flight of the Progress-M 11F615A60, which featured a TsVM-101 digital flight computer and MBITS digital telemetry system, in place of the earlier analogue systems. It was the first Progress-M 11F615A60 spacecraft, and had the serial number 401.

Launch
It was launched at 12:38 UTC on 26 November 2008 from Site 1/5 at the Baikonur Cosmodrome in Kazakhstan, atop a Soyuz-U carrier rocket. Following a four-day free flight, it docked with Pirs module of the ISS at 12:28 UTC on 30 November 2008.

Antenna problem
Immediately after launch, an antenna used by the spacecraft's Kurs docking system failed to deploy. The antenna was successfully deployed about three hours later after flight controllers resent the deployment command, however the spacecraft was docked using the backup TORU system, controlled by cosmonaut Yury Lonchakov, as a precaution.

Docking
It remained docked until 6 February 2009, when it undocked at 04:10 UTC. It subsequently spent two days in free flight, before being deorbited, and burning up in the atmosphere at 08:19 UTC on 8 February 2009.

Cargo
The dry cargo included Japanese food for Koichi Wakata, who arrived aboard the station in March 2009 as part of Expedition 18.

See also

 List of Progress flights
 Uncrewed spaceflights to the International Space Station

References

Spacecraft launched in 2008
Progress (spacecraft) missions
Spacecraft which reentered in 2009
Supply vehicles for the International Space Station
Spacecraft launched by Soyuz-U rockets